Patrice Desbiens (born 1948) is a Francophone Canadian poet. He was born in Timmins, Ontario and began his career as a journalist. Since making his literary debut in 1972, he has been regarded as one of Canada's most successful French-language poets.

He is associated with the founding of the publishing house Éditions Prise de parole and the Théâtre du Nouvel-Ontario in Sudbury, Ontario. 

He has received many awards for his poetry, including the Prix Champlain in 1997 for Un pépin de pomme sur un poêle à bois and the Prix de poésie Terrasses Saint-Sulpice-Estuaire for La Fissure de la fiction in 1998. He was also a finalist for the Governor General's Prize in 1985, for his book Dans l'après-midi cardiaque.

Selected works
 1974 : Ici, Editions à Mitaine,
 1977 : Les conséquences de la vie, Prise de parole,
 1979 : L'Espace qui reste, Prise de parole,
 1981 : L'Homme invisible, Prise de parole,
 1983 : Sudbury textes 1981–1983, Prise de parole,
 1985 : Dans l'après-midi cardiaque, Prise de parole, Finaliste du Prix du Gouverneur général,
 1987 : Les cascadeurs de l'amour, Prise de Parole,
 1988 : Poèmes anglais Prise de parole,
 1988 : Amour ambulance, Écrits des forges,
 1995 : Un pépin de pomme sur un poêle à bois, Prise de parole, Prix Champlain,
 1997 : L'effet de la pluie poussée par le vent sur les bâtiments, Docteur Sax,
 1997 : La fissure de la fiction, Prise de Parole,Prix de poésie des Terrasses Saint-Sulpice,
 1999 : Rouleaux de printemps, Prise de parole,
 2001 : Bleu comme un feu, Prise de parole,
 2002 : Hennissements, Prise de parole,
 2004 : Grosse guitare rouge, livre cd avec René Lussier, Prise de parole,
 2005 : Désâmé, Prise de parole,
 2007 : En temps et lieux, L'Oie de Cravan,
 2008 : Homme invisible (L') / The Invisible Man suivi de Les cascadeurs de l'amour, Prise de parole,
 2008 : Décalage, Prise de parole,
 2008 : En temps et lieux 2, L'Oie de Cravan,
 2009 : En temps et lieux 3, L'Oie de Cravan,
 2011 : Pour de vrai, L'Oie de Cravan.
 2013 : Les abats du jour, L'Oie de Cravan.
 2013 : Sudbury poèmes 1979–1985, BCF poésie, Prise de parole

References

20th-century Canadian poets
21st-century Canadian poets
Canadian male poets
Canadian poets in French
Writers from Timmins
Franco-Ontarian people
1948 births
Living people
20th-century Canadian male writers
21st-century Canadian male writers